Mikko Virtanen (born March 7, 1994) is a Finnish professional ice hockey player. He is currently playing for KalPa of the Finnish Liiga.

Virtanen previously played for KooKoo and made his Liiga debut with the team during the 2015–16 Liiga season.

Awards
 Mestis Champion: 2013-14
 Mestis Silver: 2014-15

References

External links

1994 births
Living people
KooKoo players
Peliitat Heinola players
Finnish ice hockey forwards
People from Kouvola
Sportspeople from Kymenlaakso